Reductions (also called ; , pl. ) were settlements created by Spanish rulers and Roman Catholic missionaries in Spanish America and the Spanish East Indies (the Philippines). In Portuguese-speaking Latin America, such reductions were also called aldeias. The Spanish and Portuguese relocated, forcibly in many cases, indigenous inhabitants (Indians or Indios) of their colonies into urban settlements modeled on those in Spain and Portugal. 

The word "reduction" can be understood wrongly as meaning "to reduce." Rather, the 1611 Spanish dictionary by Sebastián de Covarrubias defines reducción (reduction) as "to convince, persuade, or to order."  In colonial Mexico, they were called "congregations" (congregaciones). The goal of forced resettlements were to concentrate indigenous people into communities, facilitating civil and religious control over populations. The concentration of the indigenous into towns facilitated the organization and exploitation of their labor. The practice began during Spanish colonization in the Caribbean, relocating populations to be closer to Spanish settlements, often at a distance from the their home territories and likely facilitated the spread of disease. Reductions could be either religious, established and administered by an order of the Roman Catholic church especially the Jesuits, or secular, under the control of Spanish or Portuguese governmental authorities. The best known, and most successful, of the religious reductions were those created by the Jesuits in Paraguay and neighboring areas in the 17th century. The largest and most enduring secular reductions were those imposed on the highland people of the former Inca Empire of Peru during the rule of Viceroy Francisco de Toledo (1569–1581).

The Caribbean
The policy of reductions was begun in 1503 by Spanish colonists on Caribbean islands. In the words of the Spanish rulers, "It is necessary that the Indians be assigned to towns in which they will live together and that they not remain or wander separated from each other in the backcountry." The Spanish ordered Indian villages to be destroyed and selected sites where new villages should be built. The concentration, or reducción of the Indian population, facilitated the Spaniards' access to Indian labor, the promulgation of Christianity, and the collection of taxes and tribute. Moreover, the reduction of the Indians was intended to break down ethnic and kinship ties and detribalize the residents to create a generic, pan-Indian population, disregarding their numerous tribes and different cultures.

North America
The Spanish began creating reductions in Mexico shortly after Hernan Cortés's conquest in the 1520s. They were begun in Baja California in the 17th century and California in the late 18th century. Reductions in Mexico were more commonly known as congregaciones.

South America

Indian reductions in the Andes, mostly in present-day Peru and Bolivia, began on a large scale in 1570 during the rule of Viceroy Francisco de Toledo.  Toledo worked to remake the society of the former Inca empire, with some success. In a few years, he had resettled about 1.4 million Indians into 840 communities, many of which were the nuclei of present-day cities, towns, and villages. Probably the most famous of the reductions were in the areas of present-day Paraguay and neighboring Argentina, Brazil, and Bolivia in the 17th and 18th centuries. These were created and governed by the Jesuit order of the Catholic Church.

Philippines

In the Spanish Philippines, the Spanish colonial government founded hundreds of towns and villages across the archipelago modeled on towns and villages in Spain. The authorities often adopted a policy of reductions for the resettlement of inhabitants from far-flung scattered barrios or barangays to move into a centralized cabecera (town/district capital), where a newly built church and an ayuntamiento (town hall) were situated. This allowed the government to defend, control and Christianize the indigenous population in scattered independent settlements, to conduct population counts, and to collect tributes.

A similar policy was implemented in the nearby Mariana Islands during the Spanish–Chamorro Wars (1670-1699).

See also
Indian reductions in the Andes

References

Further reading
Cline, Howard F.. "Civil Congregation of the Indians of New Spain, 1598-1606." Hispanic American Historical Review, vol. 29, (1947) no. 3, pp. 349–369 

Spanish colonization of the Americas
History of indigenous peoples of the Americas
History of New Spain
Latin American caste system